see also: 18th century in games, 1900s in games

Games released or invented in the 19th century
The Mansion of Happiness (1843) ~ the first commercially produced game in the US
Bell and Hammer
The Game of Authors (1861)
Snakes and ladders (1870)
Game of the District Messenger Boy, or Merit Rewarded (1886)
Messenger Boy (1886)
Game of the Telegraph Boy (1888)
Chinese Checkers ~ derived from Halma
Ludo (1896)
Reversi (1898) also branded as Annexion or Annexation.

Significant games-related events in the 19th century
The Milton Bradley Company is founded in Springfield, Massachusetts (1860).
E.G. Selchow & Co. founded (1867), later changing its name to Selchow and Righter (1880).
Parker Brothers founded by George S. Parker (1883).

Games
19